The Coaches' Trophy (officially known as the AFCA National Championship Trophy and popularly as "the crystal football") is the trophy awarded annually by the American Football Coaches Association (AFCA) to the NCAA Division I FBS college football national champion as determined by the Coaches Poll. The trophy has been presented since 1986 and was contractually given to the winner of the BCS National Championship Game and its predecessors from 1992 to 2013. It will continue to be awarded to the No. 1 ranked team in the final poll of the season.

Patrick and Michael Gerrits came up with the idea for a college football trophy to be awarded to the AFCA national champions along with an academic scholarship award to a non-athlete. The intent was to honor the memory of the patriarch of the Gerrits family, Edward J. Gerrits. The trophy consists of a Waterford Crystal football affixed to an ebony base, and carries a value of over $30,000. The winning school retains permanent possession of the trophy, as a new one is awarded every year. It is handmade by master craftspeople at Waterford Crystal and reportedly takes nearly three months to complete.

The trophy has undergone several sponsorship changes over the years.  It was sponsored by the Gerrits Foundation during the initial 1986 and 1987 seasons and, through the Gerrits' family Pepsi bottling business, Pepsi became a co-sponsor with the Gerrits Foundation in 1988 and 1989. Due to the poll's affiliation with the United Press International wire service, it was known as the Gerrits Foundation-UPI Coaches Trophy, the UPI Coaches Trophy or UPI Trophy during that time. McDonald's was the sole sponsor from 1990 to 1992. Sears began its sponsorship in 1993 and remained until 2001. Circuit City assumed the sponsorship for the 2002 season. ADT Security Services was the title sponsor from 2003 to 2005; and from 2009 to 2013, Dr Pepper sponsored the trophy. Since 2014, Amway has been the trophy sponsor.

The official name is the American Football Coaches Association National Championship Trophy; it was given this permanent name by the association in 2006. In 2009, the AFCA allowed universities to buy replica trophies for any year a school finished first in the Coaches' Poll, from the 1950 to 1985 seasons, prior to the trophy's creation in 1986. Around this time the AFCA also began the process of awarding retroactive titles for the 1922 to 1949 seasons. The AFCA asked schools who felt they had a legitimate bid for the title to submit their reasons why so that their committee could hear the case and decide. In 2016 Oklahoma A&M was awarded the 1945 national championship. Oklahoma State was (and continues to be) the only school to apply for the honor for any of the 28 years considered, and was awarded the AFCA trophy. The AFCA committee stated that Army could also be recognized as co-champion for 1945 "if the school decides to submit paperwork to the AFCA for evaluation by the committee."

Through the 1973 season, the final Coaches' Poll was released in early December, after the regular season, but before postseason bowl games. Beginning with the 1974 season, the Coaches Poll conducted its final poll after the bowl games.

Throughout the eras of the Bowl Championship Series and its predecessors (1992–2013) no separate national championship trophy was commissioned by those bodies, with the AFCA Trophy serving that role. During the BCS era the Coaches Trophy was presented to the winning team in an on-field ceremony after the title game. With the end of the BCS, its successor playoff system, the College Football Playoff, commissioned a new trophy for its champion; officials wanted a new trophy that was unconnected with the previous championship system. However, coaches were "adamant" that the AFCA trophy continue to be awarded. Since the 2014 season, the trophy has been awarded to the team ranked No. 1 in the final Coaches' Poll of the season in a celebration at that team's stadium sometime after the College Football Playoff National Championship.

Winners

 

† Retroactively awarded.

By school

See also
 Coaches Poll
 NCAA Division I FBS national football championship

References

College football championship trophies
BCS National Championship Game